The Central Talmud Torah, also known as the Central Hebrew Free School, was a Jewish parochial school established in 1892 and located at 314-320 Catharine Street from 1911 until 1963 in the Queen Village neighborhood of South Philadelphia.

Rabbi Bernard L. Levinthal initiated the establishment of the institution to serve the growing number of immigrant Jewish children in the city's Jewish quarter in South Philadelphia.

 Wolf Klebansky served as the school's president and raised $75,000 to build the school's building at 314-320 Catharine Street. The new building was dedicated on October 29, 1911. The building could accommodate 1,000 students with 17 classrooms, a library, an auditorium, a gymnasium, and a swimming pool.

Central Talmud Torah was a "religious public school," free to those unable to pay, that taught Hebrew, Jewish history, and religious studies. Jewish children attended from 4:00 PM–7:00 PM after public school.

The American Jewish Year Book reported the organization counted 7,000 members and $12,000 in total income in 1919.

The building served as the home of the Beth Jacob Day School in the 1950s and continued to be used for Jewish education until its closure in 1963. The school building was converted to loft condominiums in the 1980s.

References

Ashkenazi Jewish culture in Philadelphia
Jewish day schools in Pennsylvania
Jews and Judaism in Philadelphia